North Carolina Agricultural and Technical State University offers 177 Undergraduate, 30 master, and 9 doctoral degrees through its 9 professional colleges. The colleges and schools function as autonomous units within the university, and adheres to the university's mission and philosophy. Bachelor and Master degree programs are offered through the Colleges of Agriculture and Environmental Sciences; Arts, Humanities & Social Sciences; Business and Economics; Education; Engineering; Health & Human Sciences and the Science & Technology.  Doctoral programs are offered through the Colleges of Agriculture and Environmental Sciences; Engineering; Science & Technology; The Joint School of Nanoscience and Nanoengineering; and The Graduate College.

North Carolina A&T is one of the nation's leading producers of African-American engineers with bachelor's, master's and doctorate degrees, and  The university is also the nation's top producer of minorities with degrees (as a whole) in science, technology, engineering and mathematics. The university is also a leading producer of minority certified public accountants, landscape architects, veterinarians, and agricultural graduates.

Since 1968, A&T's academic programs were divided among nine different academic divisions. This alignment would remain until 2016, when the university again realigned its academic programs in an effort to meet the objectives of their Preeminence 2020 strategic plan.

College of Arts, Humanities and Social Sciences 
The College of Arts and Science was established in 1968. With 13 departments and programs ranging from the arts, humanities, communications, mathematics; social, behavioral and natural sciences; the College of Arts and Sciences is the largest academic unit at North Carolina A&T. The College is the nation's largest Producer of African American psychology graduates.

As of 2012, the College of Arts and Sciences has a total enrollment of 3,465 students with 3,196 being undergraduates and 269 students enrolled in the graduate program. In the 2011-2012 academic year, the university awarded 647 bachelor's, 56 master's, and 8 doctoral degrees from the college.

The current Dean of the College of Arts and Sciences is Dr. Goldie Byrd, who was appointed to the position in 2011.

Programs Offered 

 Atmospheric Sciences and Meteorology
 Biology
 Chemistry
 Criminal Justice
 English
 Energy and Environmental Systems

 History
 Journalism and Mass Communication
 Liberal Studies
 Mathematics
 Physics
 Political Science

 Psychology
 Secondary Education
 Social Work
 Sociology
 Speech
 Visual & Performing Arts/Theater & Dance

College of Engineering 

Established in 1968, the College of Engineering is distributed across six departments; chemical biological and bio engineering; civil, architectural and environmental engineering; computer science; electrical and computer engineering; industrial and systems engineering; and mechanical engineering and the interdisciplinary computational science and engineering program. The College of Engineering has consistently ranked 1st in the nation for the number of degrees awarded to African Americans at the undergraduate level for 13 consecutive years and has been the leading producer of African American female engineers at the baccalaureate level in the U.S. for at least eight consecutive years.

As of 2013, the College of Engineering has a total enrollment of 1,549 students with 1,297 undergraduates and 307 students enrolled in the graduate program.  In the 2011-2012 academic year, the university awarded 199 bachelor's, 60 master's, and 15 doctoral degrees from the college.

Until 2022, the Dean of the College of Engineering was Robin Coger. Under Dr. Coger's leadership the College continues to implement several initiatives designed to facilitate and showcase College's excellence, in line with the University's Preeminence 2020 strategic plan and the College's strategic priorities. Prior to joining A&T's faculty in July 2011, Dr. Coger served as the Founder and Director of the Center for Biomedical Engineering Systems (now the Center for Biomedical Engineering and Science) and was a Professor in the Department of Mechanical Engineering and Engineering Science (MEES) at the University of North Carolina at Charlotte.

Programs Offered 

Bachelor's degree Programs
 Architectural Engineering
 Bioengineering
 Biological Engineering
 Chemical Engineering
 Civil Engineering
 Computer Science
 Computer Engineering
 Electrical Engineering
 Industrial and Systems Engineering
 Mechanical Engineering

Master's degree Programs
 Bioengineering
 Chemical Engineering
 Civil Engineering
 Computer Science
 Computational Science and Engineering
 Electrical Engineering
 Industrial and Systems Engineering
 Mechanical Engineering 

Doctoral Degree Programs
 Computer Science
 Computational Science and Engineering
 Electrical Engineering
 Industrial and Systems Engineering
 Mechanical Engineering

College of Agriculture and Environmental Sciences 
North Carolina A&T is home to the largest agricultural school among historically black universities and is the nation's second largest producer of minority agricultural graduates. The College of Agriculture and Environmental Sciences also is a leading producer of minority landscape architects and veterinarians. The school is divided into four academic departments: the Department of Agribusiness, Applied Economics and Agriscience Education; the Department of Animal Sciences; the Department of Family and Consumer Sciences; and the Department of Natural Resources and Environmental Design.

Since 1990, enrollment in the school has increased by 75 percent. As of 2012, the total enrollment is 956 students with 777 being undergraduates and 179 students enrolled in the graduate program. In the 2011-2012 academic year, the university awarded 132 bachelor's and 65 master's from the college.

The current Dean of the College is Dr. William “Bill” Randle, who assumed leadership in 2013.

Programs Offered 

Agribusiness, Applied Economics & Agriscience Education
 Agricultural Economics
 Agricultural Education

Animal Science
 Animal Science
 Laboratory Animal Science
 Animal Health Science
 Animal Science (Animal Industry)

Family and Consumer Sciences
 Child Development
 Child Development Early Education And Family Studies
 Family And Consumer Science
 Fashion Design and Fashion Merchandising
 Food Science
 Nutritional Sciences and Dietetics

Natural Resources & Environmental Design
 Landscape Architecture
 Environmental Science
 Agricultural Science, Natural Resources (Plant Science)
 Biological Engineering
 Earth and Biological Sciences
 Horticulture

College of Education 
Established in 1968, the School of Education is spans 5 departments: Curriculum and Instruction; Human Development and Services; Human Performance and Leisure Studies; Sports Science and Fitness Management; and Leadership Studies.  The School is housed in Samuel D. Proctor Hall, named for the University's Fifth President.

As of 2012, the School of Education has a total enrollment of 1,322 students with 642 being undergraduates and 680 students enrolled in the graduate program. In the 2011-2012 academic year, the university awarded 64 bachelor's, 133 master's, and 6 doctoral degrees from the college.

The current Dean of the School of Education is Dr. William B. Harvey who was assumed the position in 2013.

Programs Offered 

Bachelor's Programs
 Elementary Education
 Special Education
 Business Administration
 Leisure Studies
 Pre-Physical Therapy

Masters Programs
 Industrial Technology
 Elementary Education
 Teaching
 Reading Education
 Adult Education
 School Counseling
 School Administration
 Mental Health Counseling
 Physical Education

Doctoral Programs
 Leadership Studies

John R. and Kathy R. Hairston College of Health & Human Sciences
The School of Nursing was established in 1953 with the first class of 15 baccalaureate nurses graduating in 1957. The school was first accredited by the National League for Nursing in 1971.

The school offers three distinct academic tracks for those wishing to pursue a degree in the Field. The Bachelor of Science in Nursing traditional (BSN) program is designed for students pursuing their first degrees in Nursing. The Accelerated Bachelor of Science in Nursing (ABSN) Entry Option is designed for second degree students who are high level achievers and desire to pursue a career as a professional registered nurse. The ABSN Entry Option curriculum is an intensive program delivered in block format over 12 months (January to December). Lastly, the BSN Completion Entry Option is designed specifically for the registered nurse whose career goals will be enhanced through additional study. The BSN Completion Entry Option is tailored for RNs that have an associate degree and wish to advance their career by getting a bachelor's degree. The entry option is designed to facilitate either part- time or full-time study and builds on the knowledge gained from the student's previous degree.

As of 2012, the School of Education has a total enrollment of 334 students. In the 2011-2012 academic year, the university awarded 34 bachelor's degrees from the school. The current Dean of the School of Nursing is Dr. Inez Tuck.

Programs Offered
 Nursing
 Pre-Nursing
 Psychology 
 Social Work 
 Sociology
 Sport Science and Fitness Management (SSFM)

Willie A. Deese College of Business and Economics 

Established in 1970, the School of Business and Economics is one of the largest producers of African-American Certified Public Accountants in the nation. According to research conducted by the School, over the last 10 Years, graduates of the department of Business Education have a 98% success rate on the Praxis II examinations. The School of Business and Economics is housed in two building, Merrick and Craig Halls, with the latter named for the former Dean of the School Dr. Quiester Craig, who served as the head of the School for over 4 decades.

The school is accredited by the Association to Advance Collegiate Schools of Business (AACSB)  The school's Department of Accounting and Finance was the first accounting program at a Historically Black College and University (HBCU) to receive accreditation by AACSB International.

As of 2012, the School of Business and Economics has a total enrollment of 1,100 students with 1054 being undergraduates and 46 students enrolled in the graduate program. In the 2011-2012 academic year, the university awarded 198 bachelor's and 11 master's degrees from the college.

The current interim Dean of the School of Business and Economics is Dr. Patrick R. Liverpool. who was appointed to the position in July 2013.

Programs Offered 

Business Education
 Accounting
 Business Education
 Administrative Systems
 Vocational Business Education
 Information Technology
 Teaching (Business Education)
 Business Teacher Education

Economics and Finance
 Economics
 Business Economics
 Economics Law
 Finance

Management
 Business Administration
 Management
 Management Information Systems
 Human Resources Management
 Entrepreneurship

Marketing, Transportation, and  Supply Chain
 Supply Chain Management
 Marketing
 Marketing (Sales)
 Transportation and Supply Chain Management

College of Technology 
Established in 1987, The School of Technology features 10 academic programs ranging from: Applied Engineering Technology, Construction Management, Electronics Technology, Environmental Health and Safety, Geomatics, Graphic Communication Systems, and Motorsports Technology; to graduate programs in Information Technology, Technology Management, and Technology Education.

Graduates of the School enjoy in many cases over 90% placement and demand competitive salaries. As of 2012, the School of Technology has a total enrollment of 796 students; with 675 undergraduates and 121 graduate students. In the 2011-2012 academic year, the university awarded 136 bachelor's and 30 master's degrees from the school.

The current Dean of the School of Technology is Ben Obinero Uwakweh.

Programs Offered 

Undergraduate Programs
 Applied Engineering Technology
 Computer Aided Drafting and Design
 Construction Management
 Electronics Technology
 Environmental Health and Safety
 Geomatics
 Integrated Internet Technology
 Motorsports Technology
 Printing and Publishing
 Technology Management

 Graduate Programs
 Technology Management
 Information Technology
 Technology Education

Joint School of Nanoscience and Nanoengineering 
Established in 2010, The Joint School of Nanoscience & Nanoengineering is an academic collaboration between North Carolina A&T and The University of North Carolina at Greensboro. The JSNN opened with 17 students in the doctoral program in nanoscience and 1 student in the professional master's program in nanoscience. According to the National Nanotechnology Initiative, The JSNN became one of fewer than 10 schools nationally to offer degree programs in nanotechnology, and is the only program created and operated collaboratively by two universities. In 2011, N.C. A&T received approval from the University of North Carolina Board of Governors for its Master of Science in Nanoengineering program, to be offered through the JSNN. In addition to the Masters of Science program, the university was approved to offer a doctoral program in Nanoengineering.

As of 2012, the JSNN has an enrollment of 26 Masters and Doctoral students. The current Dean of the JSNN is Dr. Sherine Obare.  Obare joined the JSNN after serving as associate vice president for research and a professor of chemistry at Western Michigan University.

Programs Offered 
Currently, the JSNN offers 4 Masters and Doctoral degree programs. 

 Masters Programs
 Professional Science Master's in Nanoscience
 Nanoengineering

 Doctoral Programs
 Nanoscience
 Nanoengineering

The Graduate College 
North Carolina A&T offers 45 master's concentrations through 30 degree programs and 11 doctoral concentrations through 9 doctoral degree programs, as well as a number of certificate programs through its colleges and schools. Currently, Master's and Doctoral programs are offered through schools and colleges of Agriculture and Environmental sciences, Arts and Sciences, Business and Economics, Education, Engineering, the Joint School of Nanoscience and Nanoengineering, and Technology.

In the 2013 U.S. News’ Best Grad School edition, N.C. A&T was ranked 75th for industrial, manufacturing and systems engineering and 104 th for social work.

The current Dean of the School of Graduate Studies is Dr. Sanjiv Sarin.

Programs Offered 

 Masters Programs
 English and African American Literature
 Elementary Education
 Reading Education
 Master of Arts in Teaching
 Adult Education
 Agricultural Education
 Agricultural and Environmental Systems
 Applied Mathematics
 Bioengineering
 Biology
 Chemical Engineering
 Chemistry
 Civil Engineering
 Computational Science and Engineering
 Computer Science

 Electrical Engineering
 Food and Nutritional Science
 Industrial and Systems Engineering
 Information Technology
 Instructional Technology
 Management
 Mechanical Engineering
 Mental Health Counseling
 Nanoengineering
 Health and Physical Education
 Physics
 School Counseling
 Technology Management
 School Administration
 Social Work 

 Doctoral Programs
 Computational Science and Engineering
 Computer Science
 Electrical Engineering
 Energy and Environmental Systems
 Industrial and Systems Engineering
 Leadership Studies
 Mechanical Engineering
 Nanoengineering
 Rehabilitation Counseling & Rehabilitation Counselor Education

External links
College of Arts and Sciences Website
College of Engineering Website
College of Agriculture and Environmental Sciences Website
School of Business and Economics Website
School of Education Website
School of Graduate Studies Website
School of Nursing Website
School of Technology WebsiteJoint School of Nanoscience and Nanoengineering Website

References 

Academics
University and college academics in the United States
University of North Carolina